The Downtown Line (DTL) is a medium-capacity Mass Rapid Transit (MRT) line in Singapore operated by SBS Transit. It runs from Bukit Panjang station in the north-west to Expo station in the east via the Central Area. Coloured blue on the rail map, the line serves 34 stations, all of which are underground. The DTL is the fifth MRT line on the network to be opened and the third line to be entirely underground. It is the second MRT line to be operated by SBS Transit, after the North East Line.

Originally planned as three separate lines, the lines merged into the Downtown Line in 2007 and construction began in three stages. The first section, from Bugis to Chinatown station (formerly the Downtown Extension of the Circle Line), opened in December 2013, followed by the second section from Bukit Panjang to Rochor station (formerly the Bukit Timah Line) opening in December 2015. The third and final stage, from Fort Canning to Expo station (formerly the northern part of the East Coast Line), opened in October 2017. At , the DTL is the longest underground and automated rapid transit line in Singapore . The train utilises the Bombardier Movia C951 which runs in a three-car formation on the line.

The line is set to be further extended in the 2020s. Stage 3e, an extension of the line to Sungei Bedok, is under construction and is scheduled to begin operations in 2025, while a new infill station, Hume station, is planned to open in 2025. An extension to connect with the North South line at Sungei Kadut station is also being planned and set to open in the 2030s.

History

Background and inception
At the official opening of the Dover station on 23 October 2001, then-Minister for Communications and Information Technology Yeo Cheow Tong announced three MRT lines, two of which―the Bukit Timah Line and the northern part of the Eastern Region Line―are part of today's DTL. The Bukit Timah Line aimed to alleviate the traffic problems along the Bukit Timah and Dunearn Road corridor, and provide a direct link to the city area for residents in Choa Chu Kang and Bukit Panjang. The proposed Eastern Region Line, slated to be a loop in the eastern regions, aimed to relieve the passenger load on the often-congested East West line and benefiting those living in Tampines, Bedok and Marine Parade.

On 14 June 2005, the Land Transport Authority (LTA) announced the Downtown Extension (renamed to "Downtown Line Stage 1"), which would serve the New Downtown at Marina Bay area, where an integrated resort (Marina Bay Sands) and Singapore's second botanical garden (Gardens by the Bay) were to be located. The  extension, estimated to cost S$1.4 billion, was initially announced to be part of the Circle line. On 27 April 2007, then Transport Minister Raymond Lim announced that the Downtown Line would be built in three stages stretching  with 33 stations.

Construction and opening

The line was built in 3 stages:
Stage 1 of the Downtown line, stretching , started construction in January 2008 at Chinatown station, where platform provisions were built to facilitate an interchange station during the construction of the North East line. It began service on 22 December 2013, with its official inauguration made on the day before by Prime Minister Lee Hsien Loong.

Construction for Stage 2 began on 3 July 2009 with a groundbreaking ceremony at Beauty World station. The line inaugurated on 27 December 2015, with free travel for all 18 stations from 27 December 2015 to 1 January 2016.

Stage 3 goes from Chinatown to Expo. The station locations and finalised route were unveiled on 20 August 2010. The route opened on 21 October 2017, with free travel for all DTL stations on the first two days of the line completion.

The line, with an estimated cost of S$12 billion, was considered the government's most ambitious rail project. The cost exceeded those of the Circle Line (at $6.7 billion) and the North East Line (at $4.6 billion). Final costs of building the line may reach an estimated about S$20.7 billion, up more than 70% from the initial estimation, due to sharp rises in construction costs and a number of changes in plans.

In October 2014, it was announced that Stage 2's opening would be pushed back to the first quarter of 2016. This was because one of the main contractors for the DTL2, Alpine Bau (which was building King Albert Park, Sixth Avenue and Tan Kah Kee), went bankrupt in mid-2013. On 28 June 2015, Transport Minister Lui Tuck Yew announced that the delay was "completely resolved" by the authorities and Stage 2's opening date was brought forward to 27 December 2015. The DTL 3 started operations on 21 October 2017, officially opened by Transport Minister Khaw Boon Wan.

To serve the line, the Gali Batu Depot was opened in December 2015 to stable 42 trains. It is situated at part of the former Kwong Hou Sua Teochew Cemetery off Woodlands Road. Also in February that year, the Land Transport Authority announced that the capacity of the depot will be expanded to stable 81 trains by 2019.

Future
On 17 January 2013, plans were announced for a southern extension extending from Expo to connect with the Eastern Region line (ERL); the ERL has since been subsumed into the Thomson-East Coast line. The extension was to provide more travel options and enhance connectivity for the residents along the East Coast. The Downtown Line 3 extension (DTL3e) was finalised and announced on 15 August 2014, in conjunction with the announcement of the Thomson–East Coast line. Two stations, Xilin MRT station and Sungei Bedok MRT station, will be added to the Downtown Line, with Sungei Bedok as an interchange station with the Thomson–East Coast line. Expected to be completed in 2025, Stage 3e will connect the current East West line at Expo station and the future TEL at Sungei Bedok station.

On 7 March 2019, Hume station was announced to be opened by 2025 to better serve Hillview residents. An additional extension to the Downtown Line to Sungei Kadut station from Bukit Panjang station was announced on 25 May 2019 by the LTA. The extension is set to cut down travel time to the downtown area by up to 30 minutes for those living in the northwestern area of Singapore. The extension is expected to be completed by the mid-2030s. A study will also be conducted to determine the stops to be added between the Sungei Kadut and the existing Bukit Panjang stations.

Notable incidents
A malfunction in the platform screen doors at Botanic Gardens station resulted in trains bypassing the station and a seven-hour disruption on 3 May 2017. Downtown line operator SBS Transit said that the doors malfunctioned at 5:45am due to a signalling-related fault, and could not open automatically. The fault was rectified at 12:54pm and the platform reopened for passenger service, with the affected door remaining closed for repairs.

Network and operations

Route

The Downtown line generally goes in an east–west direction from Bukit Panjang in the northwestern side of Singapore, through the downtown area of Singapore, to Tampines and the Singapore Expo in the east. Before Bukit Panjang station, there exists a brief northwards extension to the line's depot Gali Batu Depot. The line begins at the Bukit Panjang station and then goes in the southeast direction, running parallel to Upper Bukit Timah Road and along the Bukit Timah Canal through Bukit Timah. The line then enters the central area, passing through Little India station before reaching the Central Business District via Bugis station. The Downtown line runs parallel to the Circle line at the Promenade and Bayfront stations. Passing through the Downtown Core, the line interchanges with the North East line at Chinatown station.

After Chinatown station, the line goes in a northeast direction and under the Singapore River. Between the Bencoolen and Jalan Besar stations, the line intersects itself, the first MRT line to do so. After Geylang Bahru station, the line continues in a general eastwards direction, through the industrial areas of Kampong Ubi and Kaki Bukit (briefly paralleling Ubi Avenue 2 and Kaki Bukit Avenue 1), before continuing towards the Tampines Regional Centre and goes southwards, ending at Changi Business Park. The DTL3 extension (DTL3e) from Expo station will extend the line further towards the Thomson–East Coast line at Sungei Bedok station.

Stations
Station codes for the line are blue, corresponding to the line's colour on the system map. Most stations have island platforms, with the exception of Downtown, Telok Ayer, Chinatown, and MacPherson stations having side platforms, and Stevens and Promenade stations having stacked side platforms.

Legend

List

Depots

Rolling stock

, the Downtown line has one type of rolling stock, the Bombardier MOVIA C951(A) cars, running in a three-car formation. They have been stabled at Gali Batu Depot since it opened with Stage 2 of the downtown line on 27 December 2015. For the period between the opening of Stage 1 and that of Stage 2, trains were stabled at a maintenance facility that was built at Marina Bay as part of the Circle line project. Kim Chuan Depot housed the Operations Control Centre for the Downtown Line Stage 1 until Gali Batu Depot was ready.

On 12 October 2012, the first of 11 trains for the line arrived at Jurong Port. It was transported to Kim Chuan Depot to undergo testing by the LTA before it was handed over to SBS Transit.  , Bombardier had delivered five of the 11 trains for Downtown line stage 1. LTA together with the operator, SBS Transit, conducted the necessary tests to ensure safety standards, functional performance and systems compatibility requirements were met before revenue service began on 22 December 2013.

Testing for Stage 2 began on 25 October 2015 and rolling stock that was delivered to Gali Batu Depot commenced service in Stage 1 on 21 October 2015, while SBS Transit slowly moved the equipment managing the DTL trains to Gali Batu Depot during non-revenue hours. Kim Chuan Depot, together with the adjacent Tai Seng Facility Building, operated in a minor capacity until Stage 3 opened. A new depot, named the East Coast Integrated Depot, is planned to provide additional stabling capacity to the line in 2025. Testing on the integration of systems of Stage 3 and the rest of the line started from 14 May 2017 till 27 August 2017.

Train control
The Downtown line is equipped with Siemens (previously Invensys before Siemens acquisition) Trainguard Sirius Communications-based train control (CBTC) moving block signalling system with Automatic train control (ATC) under Automatic train operation (ATO) GoA 4 (UTO). The subsystems consist of Automatic train protection (ATP) to govern train speed, Controlguide Rail 9000 Automatic Train Supervision (ATS) to track and schedule trains and Trackguard Westrace MK2 Computer-based interlocking (CBI) system that prevents incorrect signal and track points to be set.

A fall-back signalling system, relying on conventional track-circuit occupancy detection, is included to ensure fully automatic operation and train protection independent of the radio system.

Platform screen doors (PSDs) along the line were installed by Westinghouse Signal (Invensys Rail Group), supplied by Faiveley. The PSDs provide safety for passengers, offering protection from arriving and departing trains.

Notes

References

External links
 Downtown Line
The Downtown Line - A commemorative book by LTA detailing the construction of the DTL

;

Mass Rapid Transit (Singapore) lines
Proposed public transport in Singapore
Buildings and structures under construction in Singapore
Railway lines opened in 2013
2013 establishments in Singapore